1987 in philosophy

Events

Publications 
 Paul Feyerabend, Farewell to Reason (1987)
 Allan Bloom, The Closing of the American Mind (1987)
 Thomas Nagel, What Does It All Mean? (1987)
 Bruno Latour, Science in Action (1987)
 Alain Finkielkraut, The Defeat of the Mind (1987)
 Jerry Fodor,  Psychosemantics (1987)

Deaths 
 October 30 - Joseph Campbell (born 1904)

References 

Philosophy
20th-century philosophy
Philosophy by year